"He Mele Lāhui Hawaiʻi" ("Song of the Hawaiian Nation") was composed by Liliʻuokalani in November 1866 at the request of Kamehameha V, who wanted a national anthem to replace the British anthem "God Save the King".  It replaced Lunalilo's composition "E Ola Ke Aliʻi Ke Akua" as the national anthem. Liliʻuokalani wrote: "The king was present for the purpose of Criticising my new composition of both words and music, and was liberal in his commendations to me on my success. He admired not only the beauty of the music but spoke enthusiastically of the appropriate words, so well adapted to the air and to the purpose for which they were written. This remained in use as our national anthem for some twenty years or more when my brother composed the words Hawaiʻi Ponoʻī."

Liliʻuokalani's memoir, Hawaii's Story by Hawaii's Queen, stated: "In the early years of the reign of Kamehameha V. he brought to my notice the fact that the Hawaiian people had no national air. Each nation, he said, but ours had its statement of patriotism and love of country in its own music; but we were using for that purpose on state occasions the time-honored British anthem, "God save the Queen."  

By July 1867, the song was printed and was available for purchase in Honolulu, becoming the first of her compositions ever published. This decidedly Christian song served as the national anthem for ten years until her brother, by that time reigning as King Kalākaua, set it aside in favor of his own composition, "Hawaiʻi Ponoʻī", in 1876.

Lyrics

See also 
 Compositions by Liliuokalani

References

External links 
Youtube: Liliuokalani He Mele Lahui Hawai'i
Royal Hawaiian Band recording (MP3 generated from MIDI) and PDF sheet music

Symbols of Hawaii
Historical national anthems
Hawaiian songs
Compositions by Liliuokalani
1867 songs
Songs about Hawaii
Oceanian anthems
1867 establishments in Hawaii